Until June is the self-titled debut album by alternative rock band Until June. The album was released on April 17, 2007 on Flicker Records.

Track listing 
 "Sleepless" – 2:56
 "What I've Done" – 3:16
 "The Saddest Song" – 3:12
 "Unnoticed" – 3:11
 "All I Have" – 2:48
 "Hindsight" – 2:39
 "Outer Space" – 3:41
 "Don't Walk Away" – 2:38
 "This City" – 2:48
 "You Do" – 3:33
 "Underneath" - 3:21 

Also included music video for "Sleepless" Japanese version only

Album credits
Produced by Brian Garcia

Notes
 This album went through several release date changes before finally settling on its current one. The album has been scheduled for June 6, 2006; August 2006; February 20, 2007; March 20, 2007; and finally April 17, 2007. The reason behind all the delays is due to Sony/BMG purchasing their label.
 The song "Sleepless" was featured on Oseven: The Year's Best Christian Rock Hits along with Skillet, Pillar, Jars of Clay, Krystal Meyers, and many other notable Christian rock artists.
 The songs "What I've Done," "The Saddest Song," and "You Do" were featured on Until June's The EP.
 This album was Wise Men Promotions' Album of the Month in February 2007.

References 

2007 debut albums
Until June albums
Flicker Records albums